Royal Air Force Annan or more simply RAF Annan is a former Royal Air Force station located about  north-east of the town of Annan, Dumfries and Galloway, Scotland, which was operational during the Second World War.

Station history
Initially serving as a sub-site of No. 18 Maintenance Unit in 1940–1941, RAF Annan was opened as an air station in April 1942 as the base for No. 55 Operational Training Unit RAF (OTU), to train fighter pilots. As part of No. 81 Group 55 OTU pilots flew at low level over the Solway Firth training to fly "Rhubarb" missions, crossing the English Channel to attack targets of opportunity in France and the Low Countries. Initially they flew Hawker Hurricanes; and later, Miles Master trainers and Hawker Typhoon fighter-bombers. In June 1943 55 OTU was transferred to No. 9 Group; and on 26 January 1944 was redesignated No. 4 Tactical Exercise Unit (TEU), then No. 3 TEU on 28 March 1944. No. 3 TEU moved to RAF Aston Down in July 1944, and Annan then served as a sub-site of No. 14 Maintenance Unit from August 1944 until August 1952.

Units
The following units were based at RAF Annan:
 Sub-site, No. 18 Maintenance Unit RAF (1940 – 1941)
 No. 55 Operational Training Unit RAF (April 1942 – January 1944)
 Night Conversion Unit (March – April 1944) (Part of 55 OTU)
No. 4 Tactical Exercise Unit (January – March 1944)
No. 3 Tactical Exercise Unit (March – May 1944)
 Detachment, No. 10 (Observers) Advanced Flying Unit RAF (April 1942)
 No. 107 Squadron RAF (August 1942)
 Sub-site, No. 14 Maintenance Unit RAF (August 1944 – August 1952)
 No. 56 (Maintenance) Wing RAF (July 1944 - May 1946)

Station facilities
The air station had two concrete runways at right angles, running north-east/south-west, and north-west/south-east. The main technical area was in the north-eastern sector, and there were at least seven blister hangars around the perimeter.

Fate
On 1 July 1955 the site was taken over for the construction of the Chapelcross nuclear power station.

See also
 List of former Royal Air Force stations

References

Citations

Bibliography

External links
RAF Annan at solwaymilitarytrail.co.uk Retrieved 9 May 2022

A
1942 establishments in Scotland
1944 disestablishments in Scotland
RAF